Dongguantounan station is an interchange station on Line 16 and Fangshan line of the Beijing Subway.

History 
The station was originally known as Xiajia Hutong station and Fengyiqiaonan station, and was officially renamed Dongguantounan station in October 2020. The Fangshan line station opened on December 31, 2020, and the Line 16 station opened on December 31, 2022.

Station Layout 
Both the line 16 and Fangshan line stations have underground island platforms. There are 5 exits, lettered A, B, C, E and F. Exits B and E are accessible via elevators.

Gallery

See also 
Dongguantou station on Line 14

References 

Beijing Subway stations in Fengtai District